The 2016 PSL season was the fourth season of the Philippine Super Liga (PSL). There were three indoor conferences and one beach volleyball tournament for the season.

The PSL was also chosen to organize two international volleyball tournaments for the year - the 2016 Asian Women's Club Volleyball Championship and the 2016 FIVB Volleyball Women's Club World Championship - both of which were staged in the Philippines.

Background
The calendar of events for the 2016 season was finalized during the planning session between the league officials and team owners on November 11, 2015.

Starting this season, teams will offer annual exclusive contracts, instead of per-conference agreements with their players. The annual contracts will require players to play exclusively for their PSL clubs.

On September 16 to 25, selected PSL players will conduct exhibition games in the United States. After the conferences, the PSL will be holding the first Grand Volleyball Awards Night dedicated to the outstanding players and coaches who have greatest achievements in the past five conferences.

The PSL (SportsCore Event Management and Consultancy, Inc.), together with the Larong Volleyball sa Pilipinas Inc. (LVPI), will handle the hosting of the 2016 Asian Women's Club Volleyball Championship on September 3 to 11, 2016 to be held either Mall of Asia Arena or Philsports Arena, and the 2016 FIVB Volleyball Women's Club World Championship on October 18 to 23, 2016 also at the MoA Arena.

In cooperation with the Quezon City Pride Council, the PSL organized a two-day volleyball competition called "1st Quezon City Pride Volleyball Cup" on February 6–7, 2016. It was claimed as the first volleyball league in the Philippines for the LGBTs. Team Circle led by Jolas Lopez, beat Braganza team, in 4 sets, to claim the inaugural title of the QCPVC.

In June 2016, the PSL, together with the LVPI, conducted a 5-day seminar for local setters spearheaded by former South Korean men's national volleyball team head coach Kim Keung Un held at the LVPI Volleyball Center in the Arellano University campus, Manila.

During the 2016 PSL All-Filipino Conference, the league introduced its mascot named "Spikey".

On July 12, 2016, the PSL named F2 Logistics Cargo Movers middle blocker Mika Reyes as the ambassadress of the league for the 2016 season.

2016 draft

The draft ceremony was held at the SM Mall of Asia Music Hall, Pasay on May 27, 2016. Players who joined the draft underwent a pre-draft camp on May 24, 2016, at the Filoil Flying V Centre.

Draftees

First round

Second round

Indoor Volleyball

Invitational Cup

Classification round (February 18 to March 19, 2016):

Final round (April 7 to April 9, 2016):

Final standings:

Awards:

All-Filipino Conference

First round (June 18 to July 23, 2016):

Second round (July 24–31, 2016):

Group A:

Group B:

Final round (August 3–13, 2016):

Final standing:

Awards:

Grand Prix Conference 

Preliminary round (October 8 - November 24, 2016):

Final round (November 27 - December 10, 2016):
Top two teams received byes into the semi-final round.
The third ranked team will face the sixth ranked team in the quarterfinals. Likewise, the fourth ranked team will face the fifth ranked team.

Final standing:

Awards:

Beach Volleyball

Women's Division

NOTE: Withdrew during Day 1 of the tournament.

Playoffs:

Final standing:

Men's Division

Playoffs:

Final standing:

International competitions

Thai-Denmark Super League 2016

A selection of the players from the PSL participated in the 2016 Thai-Denmark Super League which was held in Bangkok, Thailand from March 23 to 28, 2016. The team played as the Petron-Philippine Super Liga team and was coached by Petron coach George Pascua. The Petron-PSL All-Stars lost all its group stage matches against Bangkok Glass, Idea Khonkaen and 3BB Nakhonnont. The team won in an exhibition game outside the scope of the tournament against the Hong Kong women's national volleyball team which was also held in Bangkok.

Head Coach: George Pascua (Petron)

2016 AVC Asian Women's Club Championship

The PSL organized the staging of the 2016 AVC Women's Club Championship under the supervision of Larong Volleyball sa Pilipinas (LVPI). The tournament was held at the Alonte Sports Arena  in Biñan from September 3 to September 11, 2016.

The Philippines was represented by the Foton Tornadoes, the champions of the 2015 PSL Grand Prix. The team finished at seventh place.

Head coach:  Fabio Menta

2016 FIVB Women's Club World Championship

The PSL organized the staging of the 2016 FIVB Volleyball Women's Club World Championship together with Larong Volleyball sa Pilipinas (LVPI). The tournament was held at the Mall of Asia Arena in Pasay from October 18 to 23, 2016. This was the first hosting by the Philippines.

The Philippines was represented by the Philippine Super Liga All-Stars playing under the name PSL-F2 Logistics Manila and finished at last place (8th).

Head coach:  Moro Branislav

Brand ambassador
 Mika Reyes

Broadcast partners
 TV5, AksyonTV, Sports5.ph

References

 
PSL
PSL